Terence West (born 19 September 1939) is a former British cyclist. He competed in the individual road race at the 1964 Summer Olympics.

References

External links
 

1939 births
Living people
British male cyclists
Olympic cyclists of Great Britain
Cyclists at the 1964 Summer Olympics
Place of birth missing (living people)